The 1976–77 Nationale A season was the 56th season of the Nationale A, the top level of ice hockey in France. 10 teams participated in the league, and Gap Hockey Club won their first league title. Diables Rouges de Briançon and Club des patineurs lyonnais were relegated to the Nationale B.

Regular season

Relegation

External links
Season on hockeyarchives.info

Fra
1976–77 in French ice hockey
Ligue Magnus seasons